This article presents a list of the historical events and publications of Australian literature during 1887.

Books 

 Francis Adams — Madeline Brown's Murderer
 Rolf Boldrewood — The Sphinx of Eaglehawk : A Tale of Old Bendigo
 Ada Cambridge — Unspoken Thoughts
 Rosa Praed — The Bond of Wedlock : A Tale of London Life

Poetry 

 Francis Adams
 "A Death at Sea"
 "Gordon's Grave"
 Poetical Works of Francis W L Adams: Complete Edition
 John Le Gay Brereton — The Triumph of Love
 Ada Cambridge
 "An Answer"
 "Fallen"
 "Good-Bye"
 "Honour"
 "What of the Night?"
 Ethel Castilla — "The Australian Girl"
 Victor Daley — "The Old Wife and the New"
 John Farrell — How He Died and Other Poems
 Henry Halloran — Poems, Odes, Songs
 Henry Lawson
 "A Song of the Republic"
 "The Wreck of Derry Castle"
 A. B. Paterson — "Only a Jockey"

Short stories 

 Edward Dyson — "A Profitable Pub"

Births 

A list, ordered by date of birth (and, if the date is either unspecified or repeated, ordered alphabetically by surname) of births in 1887 of Australian literary figures, authors of written works or literature-related individuals follows, including year of death.

 9 January — Sydney Ure Smith, publisher (died 1949)
 10 January — Margaret Fane, novelist (died 1962)
 29 May — Hal Gye, illustrator and poet (died 1967)
 29 May — Alice Gore-Jones, poet (died 1961)
 27 September — Frederick T. Macartney, poet and critic (died 1980)
 26 November — Ella McFadyen, poet (died 1976)

Deaths 

A list, ordered by date of death (and, if the date is either unspecified or repeated, ordered alphabetically by surname) of deaths in 1887 of Australian literary figures, authors of written works or literature-related individuals follows, including year of birth.

See also 
 1887 in Australia
1887 in literature
1887 in poetry
 List of years in Australian literature
List of years in literature

References

Literature
Australian literature by year
19th-century Australian literature
1887 in literature